Miou Miou is an East Bohemia indie pop band formed in the spring of 2003.

Members 

Karolina Dytrtova - vocals
Jara Tarnovski - keys, fxs
Tomas Knoflicek - guitar
Bretislav Oliva - bass guitar
Petr Krasny - drums

Discography

albums 
La La Grande Finale (Piper Records 2006)

EPs 
6 chants pour les chats (EP, Purrr Records 2004)
Analogue & Acoustique (SP, Purrr Records 2005)

External links 

Myspace
YouTube Channel

Czech alternative rock groups
Indie pop groups
Musical groups established in 2003